Double Bay ferry services (numbered F7) connect wharves in Sydney's Eastern Suburbs with Circular Quay by commuter ferry. The services are provided by Sydney Ferries, an agency of the Government of New South Wales. The route is coloured dark green on the current Sydney Ferries network map. SuperCats are the primary vessel on the route with some Double Bay services operated by First Fleet ferries.

Wharves
[
{
  "type": "ExternalData",
  "service": "page",
  "title": "Circular Quay ferry wharf.map"
},
{
  "type": "ExternalData",
  "service": "page",
  "title": "F7 Double Bay ferry stops.map"
}
]
 Circular Quay- Circular Quay is a major Sydney transport hub, with a large ferry, rail and bus interchange. The Cahill Expressway is a prominent feature of the quay, running from the east, over the elevated railway station to join the Sydney Harbour Bridge in the west. Sydney Cove was the site of the initial landing of the First Fleet in Port Jackson. Circular Quay was originally mainly used for shipping and slowly developed into a transport, leisure and recreational centre. Sydney Ferries services use wharves 2, 3, 4 and 5 at Circular Quay. Each wharf has ticket vending machines and ticket barriers, and is wheelchair-accessible.
Garden Island- This wharf serves the Royal Australian Navy's Naval Heritage Centre on Garden Island. The wharf is wheelchair-accessible.
Darling Point- This wharf serves the suburb of Darling Point and is located in McKell Park. The wharf is open on weekdays only and is not wheelchair-accessible.
Double Bay- This wharf serves the suburb of Double Bay and is located on Bay Street. The wharf is not wheelchair-accessible.

Patronage
The following table shows the patronage of Sydney Ferries network for the year ending 30 June 2022.

Gallery

External links
F7 Double Bay at Transport for New South Wales

Ferry transport in Sydney
Darling Point, New South Wales
Double Bay, New South Wales